Sitaleki is a given name of Tongan origin. Notable people with the name include:

Sitaleki Akauola (born 1992), Tongan rugby league player
Sitaleki Timani (born 1986), Tongan-Australian rugby union player

Polynesian given names